Cirák is a village in Győr-Moson-Sopron county, Hungary.

External links 
 Street map 
  Cyriac Family History Project  Cirak comes from the greek KYRIAKOS 

Populated places in Győr-Moson-Sopron County